The Singularity (Phase I – Neohumanity) is the sixth full-length studio album by Swedish metal band Scar Symmetry, released by Nuclear Blast on 3 October 2014 (EU). This is the first album of the Singularity trilogy, and the first Scar Symmetry album to be composed, produced, mixed and mastered entirely by guitarist Per Nilsson, and is the last album with Kenneth Seil on bass.

The Singularity (Phase I – Neohumanity) sold 1,500 units in the United States in its first week and debuted at No. 199 on the Billboard 200.

Album information
The first phase of the trilogy is centered on the rise of "artilects (artificial intellects) with mental capacities far above the human level of thought" and that "by the year 2030, one of the world's biggest industries will be 'artificial brains,' used to control artilects that will be genuinely intelligent and useful." The lyrical content focuses on the divide between "those who embrace the new technology and those who oppose it" due to the social issues caused by the rise of artificial intelligence and the emergence of transhumanists who add artilect technology to their own bodies.

Critical reception

Writing for All About The Rock Anthony Biello scored the album 8.5 out of 10 and said "I wasn't expecting such a well written record from a band I discarded years ago. If you are a fan of Power, Progressive or Death Metal, then check this out. Scar Symmetry blends all of those genres together unlike any other band I've ever heard before. Supposedly this is the first concept album of a trilogy, and if the next 2 are even close to The Singularity (Phase I – Neohumanity), I would consider it a success."

Track listing

Personnel
Lars Palmqvist – clean vocals, backing vocals
Roberth Karlsson – harsh vocals, backing vocals (tracks 2 and 3)
Per Nilsson – guitars, keyboards, backing vocals, clean vocals (tracks 1, 2, 5 and 8)
Kenneth Seil – bass
Henrik Ohlsson – drums

Release history

References

Scar Symmetry albums
Nuclear Blast albums
2014 albums